Sir John Hurley, Irish Jacobite, fl. 1714.

Biography
Sir John Hurley was a grandson of Sir Maurice Hurley of Knocklong, eldest son of Sir Thomas and Joanna. His father, Sir William, was an M.P. for Kilmallock in 1689 and married Mary Blount. 

Of him, a family website states:

He appears to be the John Hurley who was a recruiter for the Irish Brigades in the early 18th century (p.204) but is confused in the sources with his cousin, Colonel John Hurley.

He was a cousin of Luis Roberto de Lacy (1772–1817), brigadier general of the Spanish Army who fought for Spain in the Peninsular War.

Family tree

     Teige Ó hUirthile, lord of Knocklong, County Limerick and Chief of the Name 
     |
     |
     |                                 | 
     |                                 |
     Dermod                            Tomás Ó hUirthile, fl. 1585.
    =?                                =?   
     |                                 |
     |                                 |___
     Juliana                           |             |
    =Edmond Óge de Courcy              |             |
     |                                 Randal        Maurice Ó hUirthile of Knocklong, fl. 1601-34.
     |                                              =Racia Thornton (dsp)  =Gráinne Ní hÓgáin
     John, 18th Baron Kingsale                                          |
                                                                            |
                                                                            Sir Thomas O'Hurley
                                                                           =Joanna Brown of Mount Brown, Limerick
                                                                            |
     ___|
     |                            |       |                         |                          |                |
     |                            |       |                         |                          |                | 
     Sir Maurice, died c. 1683.   John    Catherine                 Anne                       Grace            Elinora
    =?                           =?      =Peirce, Lord Dunboyne    =Daniel Ó Maoilriain   =Walter Bourke   =David Barry
     |                            |
     |                            |
     Sir William, fl. 1689.       John
    =Mary Blount                 =?
     |                            | 
     |                            |
   Sir John Hurley', fl. 1714.   Colonel John Hurley, fl. 1694.

See also

 Diarmaid Ó hUrthuile, Archbishop of Cashel, c. 1530 – 21 June 1584.
 Colonel John Hurley, raparee, fl. 1694.

External links

 http://www.dalcassiansept.com/pedigrees/ohurley.htm

References

 Irish Pedigrees, pp.221-23, John O'Hart, volume 1, 1892; reprinted 1989. 
 Ireland and the Jacobite Cause, 1685-1766:A fatal attachment, p. 204, Éamonn Ó Ciardha, Four Courts Press, 2001, 2004. .

Irish Jacobites
People from County Limerick